Lewo (also known as Varsu or Laewo) is an Oceanic language spoken on Epi Island, in Vanuatu.

Overview 
Lewo is spoken on the eastern part of Epi Island in Shefa Province. As of 2001, there are approximately 2,200 speakers of Lewo. Despite being the most widely spoken language in eastern Epi, speakers of Lewo can be found in various parts of the island; village settlements are small but widely scattered.

Lewo previously had many more different dialects than it does today, and many lexical items from various Epi languages are said to have originated from Lewo. Tasiko (sometimes Tasiwo), Lemaroro and Maluba (Malupa) are all dialects of Lewo. Many Lewo speakers are bilingual, with proficiency in Bierebo; only the very elderly and very young are monolingual. Lewo is closely related to the Epi language of Lamen, sharing 78% lexical similarity.

Phonology

Consonants

Vowels 

 /a/ is heard as [æ] when occurring after labial consonants /p, m, β/. It is heard as [a] elsewhere.
 Vowels /e, o, u/ within the peak of closed syllables are heard as [ɛ, ɔ, ʊ].

Morphology and word classes

Demonstratives and spatial deixis 
Lewo identifies four grades of deixis when referencing spatial location. For expressing reference to an object which is located near the speaker, such as in physical contact with the speaker or in the same surrounding area, the deictic particle nini is used. If the object is closer to the hearer, the particle nam̃aa is used. Conversely, if the object in reference is proximity to both speaker and hearer, or within the speaker-hearer interaction, the particle nene is used. The fourth deictic particle, nena, is used to express distal or unknown location.

Lewo's four-way deixis system is atypical from those employed by other Oceanic non-Polynesian and Polynesian languages. Typically, these languages have only three grades of deictic relationship referencing: near speaker, near hearer, and elsewhere.

Lewo has a noun-demonstrative (NDem) word order, as does most other languages in Vanuatu.

DEIC:deictic
TA:tense/aspect particle

Nini 
Nini marks an explicit reference to an entity which is in proximity or physically connected to the speaker.

Nam̃aa 
Nam̃aa is employed when referencing objects within the proximity of the hearer, such as objects the hearer is carrying.

Early also notes an additional pragmatic function to this particle, whereby it is employed by speakers to request an object be brought to the location of the hearer. See example (6) below demonstrating an interaction between a father (speaker) and mother (hearer) about their child.

Despite the father being located closer to the child (and thus would typically employ nini), he uses nam̃aa to request the mother to aid their child instead of himself.

Nene 
Because nene is used to address entities near both speaker and hearer, it is also frequently employed for general unmarked deictic references. Due to this general use, it often mimics the function of a definite article. As Lewo only has an indefinite article tai ('a', 'one'), it seems nene functions in place of the definite.

Nena 
While not frequently used, nena can be employed to indicate spatial reference.

While the particle is known to reference distal or unknown location, Early notes a more common function of nena, in which it presents an identified object, providing importance or instancy to it. See examples (10) and (11).

Deictic clitics 
The Lewo deictic particles, with the exception of nam̃aa, can each be shortened to a monosyllabic form in order to cliticise to other words. Early gives an example of this cliticisation with deictic particles following the preposition e.

This cliticisation can occur with various nouns and verbs. For instance, the word for 'man' 'yaru + 'nene becomes 'yar-ne 'that man'. The verb 'be like' 'sa + 'nini occurs as 'sa-n(i) 'like this'.

Nap̃a 
In Lewo, the relative pronoun nap̃a functions as a deictic. to equate to the English 'the aforementioned'. Despite being glossed as REL, it acts as a discourse-level deictic in many instances.

Additionally, ap̃a functions as an anaphoric deictic particle. That is, it functions to provide anaphoric reference to an already-introduced entity. It is also employed to refer to entities part of real-life environment, or shared knowledge of the interlocutors.

In example (13), nap̃a appears before the conjunction ana. As the conjunction is part of the following clause, nap̃a functions here to bring an entity (pui 'pig') into the foreground.

Nap̃a also interacts frequently with the main deictic system in Lewo. As the function of nene can be often be described as an anaphoric reference marker, it is often cliticised with nap̃a and as such produces the form nap̃a-ni. Such cliticisation also occurs with the other deictic particles, producing nap̃a-na and nap̃a-ne. See example (14):

In this example, the 'small village' narin kumali is introduced with tai (ART). In the following line, it is reintroduced as narin kumali nap̃a-na (REL-DEIC).

Another function of nap̃a as a deictic particle occurs when referring to real-world knowledge, or shared knowledge by all interlocutors. For instance, if asked where some people might be, a speaker may respond in one of two ways:

Example (15) has the unmarked case, and indicates that the people in question went to the garden that they are most likely to go to, such as their own garden. However, the addition of nap̃a in example (16) indicates a separate garden understood by both interlocutors.

This method of deixis is frequently used in Lewo, and can be used in many pragmatic contexts, to expressing deprecating, or euphemistic expressions, as shown in example (17).

Deixis in noun phrases 
Deictic particles which occur in noun phrases can not only modify nominal heads, but also function as the noun heads themselves.

Example (19) shows nam̃aa and nini as the prepositional object of e. That is, instead of functioning as a determiner to a noun, it acts as a preposition.

Example (18) shows that deictics can act additionally as nominal heads. Early notes that three of the four Lewo deictics (with the exception of nena), with the prefix na- added, act as demonstrative pronouns. See examples below:

Deixis in interrogatives 
The deictic particle nape is used to ask 'which?' in Lewo.

Example (21) demonstrates nape in the position normally occupied by constituents that modify the phrase. Example (22) shows nape as the head of the phrase.

Occasionally, nape occurs in a non-interrogative form.

References

External links 
 Materials on Lewo are included in the open access Arthur Capell collections (AC1 and AC2) held by Paradisec

Bibliography
 

R:realis mood
S:subject

Epi languages